Juan José Videgain (born 30 July 1975) is a Spanish writer, actor and director. Most of Videgain's books have reached cult status thanks to their weird sense of humor in Spain. He is from an old theatrical family in Spain. Salvador Videgain is his grandfather, José María Alvira is his granduncle.
He has written narratives, essays, and biographies. He is an active member of organizations dedicated to charity.

Biography 
Juan José Videgain was born in Madrid, Spain in 1975. In 1990s He was a veteran of the Spanish army of the twentieth century, serving in Melilla city that conquered one of his ancestors. He worked in the theatre book field from an early age. He had a brief stint in television before finding work as a film actor. His first, little-seen short film focuses on a family forced to live in a basement after a war. In his second short film, he portrayed a man rebel but also a boy who thinks he is Batman a defender of the innocent. He made a third short film The bridge of the life and Nos miran in (2002), a supernatural film of mystery, in Spain.

His book La auténtica vida e historia del teatro (2005) received acclaim from people in Spain as the best book of theatre written in years. Also he was preceded by his first collaboration with Jack Newman in theater (2002). In 2010 he collaborates with him in a chapter of his work as life itself. During these years he has signed next to the best-known pens and shared acts with the best-known characters of Spanish society. He has completed his trilogy of research and artistic knowledge, his extensive work on the world of theater. "Teatralerias".

Videgain was portrayed a soldier in the film Kingdom of Heaven, his first movie in English. The film was released in Spain in January 2004 but did not prove as great a success as hoped. The film was explicit in its portrayal of violence in medieval Jerusalem and was considered controversial by some Catholics and Muslims, so it passed cuts. The actor worked on the film only in Spain.

He collaborated with the problems of people with leukodystrophy in Spain. He has worked beneficially for years for homeless children or leukodystrophy problems so it has been awarded the 2011 ELA Prize.

Since the beginning of the decade 2010, he has started to direct and produce various audiovisual and documentary work without neglecting his role as writer. In October 2016 participated in a documentary on the life in the people of Spain, Spain in a day. The documentary directed by Isabel Coixet among others has recently won the Iris Television Prize.

Books 
He wrote works of theatre in the 2000s and during the first part of the first decade of the century he devoted himself to writing for the theater. In the second part of the decade he wrote books about famous artists cultural issue some known to him and made his foray into the world of the story. As a literary author he has traveled several times to Portugal where his work is known. Many of his works have traveled through many western countries.

Theater
 Las mocedades de España, comedy historical (2003).
 Las cartas sobre la mesa, version of a story by Agatha Christie (2005).
 Una vida en la sombra, drama historical (2006).
 Crueldades y otros menesteres, drama historical (2007).
 Napoleón solo, musical (2013).
 All this works are in Antología teatral del autor 2003-2020.

Biographies
 La auténtica vida e historia del teatro, Biographies of characters from the world of theater (2005) Vulcano Ediciones, 
 Así se vive en Hollywood, Biographies of characters from the world of cinema (2007) Vulcano Ediciones 
 Así se vive en Hollywood II, Biographies of characters from the world of cinema (2015) P & V. 
 Nosotros los artistas, Biographies of dramatic-lyric characters (2017) P & V. 
 Teatralerias, Biographies of theatrical characters (2018) P & V. 
 De Cannes a Hollywood, así vivimos en Europa.: O como somos los artistas europeos, (2021), P & V.

Narrative
 Como la vida misma, contemporary stories (2010) 
 Un mundo diferente, (2014) medieval tales 
 Iluminando la Edad Media,  medieval tales (2019)

Acting 
After acting in theater as a secondary actor in the 1990s, he worked in the early years of this century in cinematographic figuration. Most of his written works were for the theater the first years, in the second decade of the century he becomes the protagonist of numerous projects both in the direction and in the interpretation and participates in some films. He also participated in a music video demonstrating his versatility. He worked in TV series as Comrades appearing in some chapters in (1998-2002) figuration as in Journalists (1998-2002) and Central Hospital (2000-2012).

Independent films 
Since founding the nonprofit P & Videgain, in 2015, Videgain has been deeply involved with independent film. Through its various workshop programs and popular film festival, in Spain has provided much-needed support for independent filmmakers as Rubén Jiménez or Jack Newman. He has worked for other independent producers such as Valente Films or C. Alcázar.

Filmography

Interviews

 Leucodistrofia-Charity acts.

References 

 Camara de Comercio-Agenda 
 El adelantado de Segovia 
 www.labutaca.net/films/32/elreinodeloscielos6.htm
 www.youtube.com/watch?v=xjWUThiV1Nk
 J.J.Videgain
 
 El adelantado de Segovia 
 La vanguardia 24-11-2012 Cultura Muere Tony Leblanc.
 Heraldo de Aragón 25-11-2012 Abierta la capilla ardiente de Tony Leblanc.

External links

 
 
 VIAF Fichero de Autoridades Virtual Internacional, (Internet  Database)
 
 
 
  GRAVE actor Kike Camoiras.
 

1975 births
Living people
Spanish theatre directors
Spanish screenwriters
Male actors from Madrid
21st-century Spanish novelists
Spanish male novelists
Spanish essayists
Male essayists
Spanish male child actors
Juan Jose
Juan Jose
21st-century Spanish male actors
Spanish male stage actors
Male screenwriters
Spanish film directors
Spanish film producers
Documentary film producers
Spanish-language film directors
20th-century Spanish male actors
Spanish male musical theatre actors
Spanish male voice actors
Spanish Roman Catholics
21st-century essayists
Spanish male film actors
20th-century Spanish people
Writers from Madrid
21st-century Spanish male writers
21st-century Spanish screenwriters